Visions is an album by saxophonist Bunky Green recorded in New York and released by the Vanguard label in 1978.

Reception

AllMusic reviewer Scott Yanow stated: "Although much of the material on altoist Bunky Green's Vanguard album is rather unlikely, Green's solos uplift and give a new slant to the pop tunes. Green is assisted by an oversized rhythm section that includes guitarist Hiram Bullock".

Track listing 
 "Alone Again, Naturally" (Gilbert O'Sullivan) – 6:20
 "What I Did for Love" (Marvin Hamlisch, Edward Kleban) – 7:07
 "The Greatest Love of All" (Michael Masser, Linda Creed) – 6:45
 "Never Can Say Goodbye"(Clifton Davis) – 6:00
 "Ali Theme/ I Write the Songs" (Masser / Bruce Johnston) – 2:56
 "The Entertainer" (Scott Joplin) – 4:01
 "Visions" (Bunky Green) – 7:48

Personnel 
Bunky Green - alto saxophone
Hiram Bullock – guitar
Mark Gray– piano, electric piano, synthesizer
Jeff Bova – synthesizer
Wilbur Bascomb (tracks 1–6), Bob Cranshaw (track 7) – bass
Michael Carvin (track 7), Steve Jordan (tracks 1–6) – drums
Angel Allende – percussion

References 

1978 albums
Vanguard Records albums
Bunky Green albums